Los Hornos is a town in La Plata Partido, Buenos Aires, Argentina.

Los Hornos belongs to the Greater La Plata urban conglomerate. Its name, (Spanish for "the [brick] ovens" or "the furnaces"), refers to the several brick factories that were located in the area at the end of the 19th century, and which supplied the bricks for many of the buildings in the nascent city of La Plata. The area was heavily settled by Italian immigrants, and became renowned for its many family orchards. The town has a distinct personality and atmosphere.

In Los Hornos we can find the municipal cemetery, a protected local landmark, and the Parish St. Benjamin.

Populated places in Buenos Aires Province
La Plata Partido